The Lesser-Known Candidates Forum is a quadrennial event during the United States presidential election season that takes place at the St. Anselm College New Hampshire Institute of Politics since 1972. Occurring prior to the New Hampshire primary, it allows for lesser-known presidential candidates of the Democratic and Republican parties to voice their political positions.

References

External links

Recording of 2000 forum
Recording of 2004 forum
Recording of the 2012 forum
Recording of the 2016 forum
Recording of the 2020 forum

Politics of New Hampshire